Hogmanay is the Scots word for the last day of the old year and is synonymous with the celebration of the New Year in the Scottish manner. It is normally followed by further celebration on the morning of New Year's Day (1 January) and in some cases, 2 January—a Scottish bank holiday.

The origins of Hogmanay are unclear, but it may be derived from Norse and Gaelic observances of the winter solstice. Customs vary throughout Scotland, and usually include gift-giving and visiting the homes of friends and neighbours, with special attention given to the first-foot, the first guest of the new year.

Etymology
The etymology of the word is obscure. The earliest proposed etymology comes from the 1693 Scotch Presbyterian Eloquence, which held that the term was a corruption of a presumed  and that this meant "holy month". The three main modern theories derive it from a French, Norse or Gaelic root.

The first appearance in Scots language came in 1604 in the records of Elgin, as hagmonay. Subsequent 17th-century spellings include Hagmena (1677), Hogmynae night (1681), and Hagmane (1693) in an entry of the Scotch Presbyterian Eloquence.

Although Hogmanay is currently the predominant spelling and pronunciation, a number of variant spellings and pronunciations have been recorded, including:

 
 
 
 
  (Roxburghshire)
 
  (Shetland)
 
 
  (Shetland)
 

Possible French etymologies
The term may have been introduced to Middle Scots via French.

This explanation is supported by a children's tradition, observed up to the 1960s in parts of Scotland at least, of visiting houses in their locality on New Year's Eve and requesting and receiving small treats such as sweets or fruit. The second element would appear to be  ('the New Year'), with sources suggesting a druidical origin of the practice overall. In Québec,  was a door-to-door collection for the poor.

Compare also the apparent Spanish cognate /, with a suggested Latin derivation of  "in this year".

Possible Goidelic etymologies
The word may have come from the Goidelic languages. Frazer and Kelley report a Manx new-year song that begins with the line To-night is New Year's Night, Hogunnaa but did not record the full text in Manx. Manx dictionaries though give , generally glossing it as "Hallowe'en", same as many of the more Manx-specific folklore collections.

Another theory occasionally encountered is a derivation from the phrase  ("I raised the cry"), which resembles Hogmanay in pronunciation and was part of the rhymes traditionally recited at New Year but it is unclear if this is simply a case of folk etymology.

Possible Norse etymologies
Other authors reject both the French and Goidelic theories, and instead suggest that the ultimate source both for the Norman French, Scots, and Goidelic variants of this word have a common Norse root. It is suggested that the full forms
 "Hoginanaye-Trollalay/Hogman aye, Troll a lay" (with a Manx cognate )
 "Hogmanay, Trollolay, give us of your white bread and none of your gray"
invoke the hill-men (Icelandic , compare Anglo-Saxon ) or "elves" and banishes the trolls into the sea (Norse  'into the sea'). Repp furthermore makes a link between "Trollalay/Trolla-laa" and the rhyme recorded in Percy's Relics: "Trolle on away, trolle on awaye. Synge heave and howe rombelowe trolle on away", which he reads as a straightforward invocation of troll-banning.

Origins
It is speculated that the roots of Hogmanay may reach back to the celebration of the winter solstice among the Norse, as well as incorporating customs from the Gaelic celebration of Samhain. The Vikings celebrated Yule, which later contributed to the Twelve Days of Christmas, or the "Daft Days" as they were sometimes called in Scotland. Christmas was not celebrated as a festival and Hogmanay was the more traditional celebration in Scotland. This may have been a result of the Protestant Reformation after which Christmas was seen as "too Papist".

Hogmanay was also celebrated in the far north of England, down to and including Richmond. It was traditionally known as 'Hagmena' in Northumberland, 'Hogmina' in Cumberland, and  'Hagman-ha' or 'Hagman-heigh' in the North Riding of Yorkshire.

Customs
There are many customs, both national and local, associated with Hogmanay.  The most widespread national custom is the practice of first-footing, which starts immediately after midnight. This involves being the first person to cross the threshold of a friend or neighbour and often involves the giving of symbolic gifts such as salt (less common today), coal, shortbread, whisky, and black bun (a rich fruit cake), intended to bring different kinds of luck to the householder. Food and drink (as the gifts) are then given to the guests. This may go on throughout the early hours of the morning and well into the next day (although modern days see people visiting houses well into the middle of January). The first-foot is supposed to set the luck for the rest of the year. Traditionally, tall, dark-haired men are preferred as the first-foot.

Local customs

An example of a local Hogmanay custom is the fireball swinging that takes place in Stonehaven, Aberdeenshire, in northeast Scotland. As the Old Town House bell sounds to mark the new year, the balls are set alight and the swingers set off up the High Street from the Mercat Cross to the Cannon and back, swinging the burning balls around their heads as they go.

At the end of the ceremony, any fireballs that are still burning are cast into the harbour. Many people enjoy this display, and large crowds flock to see it, with 12,000 attending the 2007/2008 event. In recent years, additional attractions have been added to entertain the crowds as they wait for midnight, such as fire poi, a pipe band, street drumming and a firework display after the last fireball is cast into the sea. The festivities are now streamed live over the Internet. 
Another example of a fire festival is the burning the clavie in the town of Burghead in Moray.

In the east coast fishing communities and Dundee, first-footers once carried a decorated herring. And in Falkland in Fife, local men marched in torchlight procession to the top of the Lomond Hills as midnight approached. Bakers in St Andrews baked special cakes for their Hogmanay celebration (known as "Cake Day") and distributed them to local children.

Institutions also had their own traditions. For example, amongst the Scottish regiments, officers waited on the men at special dinners while at the bells, the Old Year is piped out of barrack gates. The sentry then challenges the new escort outside the gates: "Who goes there?" The answer is "The New Year, all's well."

An old custom in the Highlands is to celebrate Hogmanay with the saining (Scots for 'protecting, blessing') of the household and livestock. Early on New Year's morning, householders drink and then sprinkle 'magic water' from 'a dead and living ford' around the house (a 'dead and living ford' refers to a river ford that is routinely crossed by both the living and the dead). After the sprinkling of the water in every room, on the beds and all the inhabitants, the house is sealed up tight and branches of juniper are set on fire and carried throughout the house and byre. The juniper smoke is allowed to thoroughly fumigate the buildings until it causes sneezing and coughing among the inhabitants.  Then all the doors and windows are flung open to let in the cold, fresh air of the new year.  The woman of the house then administers 'a restorative' from the whisky bottle, and the household sits down to its New Year breakfast.

"Auld Lang Syne"

The Hogmanay custom of singing "Auld Lang Syne" has become common in many countries. "Auld Lang Syne" is a Scots poem by Robert Burns, based on traditional and other earlier sources. It is now common to sing this in a circle of linked arms that are crossed over one another as the clock strikes midnight for New Year's Day, though it is only intended that participants link arms at the beginning of the final verse, before rushing in to the centre as a group.

In the media
Between 1957 and 1968, a New Year's Eve television programme, The White Heather Club, was presented to herald in the Hogmanay celebrations.
The show was presented by Andy Stewart, who always began by singing "Come in, come in, it's nice to see you...." The show always ended with Stewart and the cast singing, "Haste ye Back":

The performers were Jimmy Shand and band, Ian Powrie and his band, Scottish country dancers: Dixie Ingram and the Dixie Ingram Dancers, Joe Gordon Folk Four, James Urquhart, Ann & Laura Brand, Moira Anderson & Kenneth McKellar. All the male dancers and Andy Stewart wore kilts, and the female dancers wore long white dresses with tartan sashes.
Following the demise of the White Heather Club, Andy Stewart continued to feature regularly in TV Hogmanay shows until his retirement. His last appearance was in 1992.

In the 1980s comedian Andy Cameron presented the Hogmanay Show (on STV in 1983 and 1984 and from 1985 to 1990 on BBC Scotland) while Peter Morrison presented the show A Highland Hogmanay on STV/Grampian, axed in 1993.

For many years, a staple of New Year's Eve television programming in Scotland was the comedy sketch show Scotch and Wry, featuring the comedian Rikki Fulton, which invariably included a hilarious monologue from him as the gloomy Reverend I.M. Jolly.

Since 1993, the programmes that have been mainstays on BBC Scotland on Hogmanay have been Hogmanay Live and Jonathan Watson's football-themed sketch comedy show, Only an Excuse?.

Presbyterian influence
The 1693 Scotch Presbyterian Eloquence contained one of the first mentions of the holiday in official church records. Hogmanay was treated with general disapproval. Still, in Scotland Hogmanay and New Year's Day are as important as Christmas Eve and Christmas Day.

Although Christmas Day held its normal religious nature in Scotland amongst its Catholic and Episcopalian communities, the Presbyterian national church, the Church of Scotland, discouraged the celebration of Christmas for nearly 400 years; it only became a public holiday in Scotland in 1958. Conversely, 1 and 2 January are public holidays and Hogmanay still is associated with as much celebration as Christmas in Scotland.

Major celebrations
As in much of the world, the largest Scottish cities – Glasgow, Edinburgh and Aberdeen – hold all-night celebrations, as do Stirling and Inverness.  The Edinburgh Hogmanay celebrations are among the largest in the world. Celebrations in Edinburgh in 1996–97 were recognised by the Guinness Book of Records as the world's largest New Years party, with approximately 400,000 people in attendance. Numbers were then restricted due to safety concerns.

In 2003-4 most of the organised events were cancelled at short notice due to very high winds. The Stonehaven Fireballs went ahead as planned, however, with 6,000 people braving the stormy weather to watch 42 fireball swingers process along the High Street. Similarly, the 2006–07 celebrations in Edinburgh, Glasgow and Stirling were all cancelled on the day, again due to high winds and heavy rain. The Aberdeen celebration, however, went ahead, and was opened by pop music group Wet Wet Wet.

Many Hogmanay festivities were cancelled in 2020–21 and 2021–22 due to the COVID-19 pandemic in Scotland.

Ne'erday
Most Scots still celebrate New Year's Day with a special dinner, usually steak pie.

Handsel Day

Historically, presents were given in Scotland on the first Monday of the New Year. A roast dinner would be eaten to celebrate the festival. Handsel was a word for gift and hence "Handsel Day". In modern Scotland this practice has died out.

The period of festivities running from Christmas to Handsel Monday, including Hogmanay and Ne'erday, is known as the Daft Days.

See also
Christmas in Scotland
Calennig, the last day of the year in Wales

Footnotes

Notes

References

Observations on the Popular Antiquities of Great Britain, Brand, London, 1859
Dictiounnaire Angllais-Guernesiais, de Garis, Chichester, 1982
Dictionnaire Jersiais-Français, Le Maistre, Jersey, 1966
Dictionary of the Scots Language, Edinburgh

External links

Edinburgh's Hogmanay (official site)
Hogmanay.net
 "The Origins, History and Traditions of Hogmanay", The British Newspaper Archive (31 December 2012)
Hogmanay traditional bonfire

 
Annual events in Scotland
December observances
Festivals in Scotland
Holidays in Scotland
New Year celebrations
Winter events in Scotland